Ruzbeh Mammad (Ruzbeh Gulumov Mammad oglu), is an Azerbaijani writer and journalist.

Early years 
Ruzbeh Mammad was born on October 26, 1991 in the village of Alçabulaq in the Yardımlı Rayon.

He graduated from Lankaran State University’s Faculty of Economics and Business Administration, followed with obtaining a master’s degree of Environmental Engineering in Agricultural Studies.

“Zaman-Azerbaijan” newspaper, “Yeni Avaz” newspaper, correspondent on "Yeniavaz.com" news portal. He was the founder and editor-in-chief of the Free Publication Literature portal, and presently works as a journalist.

Works 
Ruzbeh Mammad's first book, "Take me to silence", was published in 2013, and the author rejected this book and it was buried. In 2014, a 365-day poem book was published in the legal publishing house. His poems are published in famous newspapers, magazines and online magazines. The new period is one of the representatives of Azerbaijani literature. Member of the Writers' Union of Azerbaijan and Chairman of the Information Society.

Books  
 "Take me to silence" poems
 Poems "365 days"
 "The girl in the last wagon" story
 "It's about three o'clock at night, and I love you"

Awards 
 , Presidential retiree.

References

External links 
Ruzbeh Məmməd - Ölkəm darıxır (Ən Yaxşı Şeir) ayb.az (Writers' Union of Azerbaijan)

1991 births
Living people
Azerbaijani writers
Lankaran State University alumni